Ṭīwī is a town in Oman. It is known for an archaeological site in the area known as al-Jurayf, in Ṣūr Wilayat Sharqiyah. The town and the site are located between Wadi Shab and Wadi Tiwi on the Gulf of Oman.

Archaeological site
This fortified village was inhabited in the Samad Late Iron Age and during Islamic times. It is known as Tiwi site TW2 (22°49'14.38"N, 59°15'34.00"E, 75 m altitude).

The archaeological site lies inside the cusp of  a mountain and contains surface finds attributable to the Samad Late Iron Age  It lies 700 m west of the coast. Hidden behind the easternmost cusp of a volcanic wall, this settlement is little visible from the sea or the nearby coastal road. It was mapped and surveyed in 2002.

The preservation condition and our recording methods condition the appearance of the resulting sketch. It was re-mapped in 2014. The site seems to have been in sporadic use into the recent period. Shortly after investigation the site was badly bull-dozed in order to build the coastal motorway and to develop the area commercially.

See also

 Archaeology of Oman
 Samad al-Shan

Sources
 Jürgen Schreiber, Transformationsprozesse in Oasensiedlungen Omans. Die vorislamische Zeit am Beispiel von Izki, Nizwa und dem Jebel Akhdar. Dissertation, Munich, 2007. URL http://edoc.ub.uni-muenchen.de/7548/1/Schreiber_Juergen.pdf
Paul Yule, Die Gräberfelder in Samad al-Shan (Sultanat Oman): Materialien zu einer Kulturgeschichte (Rahden 2001), .
Paul Yule, Cross-roads – Early and Late Iron Age South-eastern Arabia, Abhandlungen Deutsche Orient-Gesellschaft, vol. 30, Wiesbaden 2014, 
Paul Yule, Valourising the Samad Late Iron Age, Arabian Archaeology and Epigraphy 27/1, 2016, 31‒71, .

References

External links
http://heidicon.ub.uni-heidelberg.de/pool/oman

History of Oman
Archaeological sites in Oman